W1 could refer to:

 W1, a postcode district in the W postcode area of London
 British NVC community W1 (Salix cinerea - Galium palustre woodland), one of the woodland communities of the British National Vegetation Classification
 W-1 tool steel, a water-hardening steel
 one of four manuscripts containing the Magnus Liber, or Magnus liber organi, a compilation of medieval music. The term is derived from the Wolfenbüttel library which holds the manuscript (Herzog August Bibliothek).
 GN W-1, an electric locomotive built for the Great Northern Railway
 LNER Class W1, an experimental locomotive designed by Sir Nigel Gresley for the London and North Eastern Railway
 second step of the W0-W6 scale for the classification of meteorites by weathering
 Wrestle-1, a Japanese professional wrestling promotion
 The computational complexity class W[1] in parameterized complexity
 The Apple W1 wireless pairing chip primarily used in AirPods
 W1 tram, a class of electric trams built by the Melbourne & Metropolitan Tramways Board.

W-1 could refer to:
 U.S. uniformed services pay grades#Warrant Officer pay grades

See also
WI (disambiguation)